Ericthonius is a genus of amphipods in the family Ischyroceridae. There are at least 20 described species in Ericthonius.

Species
These 23 species belong to the genus Ericthonius:

 Ericthonius argenteus Krapp-Schickel, 1993 g
 Ericthonius brasiliensis (Dana, 1853) i c g
 Ericthonius brevicarpus Vader & Myers, 1996 g
 Ericthonius convexus Ariyama, 2009 g
 Ericthonius coxacanthus Moore, 1988 g
 Ericthonius didymus Krapp-Schickel, 2013 g
 Ericthonius difformis H. Milne Edwards, 1830 i c g
 Ericthonius fasciatus (Stimpson, 1853) i c g
 Ericthonius forbesii Hughes & Lowry, 2006 g
 Ericthonius grebnitzkii Gurjanova, 1951 i c g
 Ericthonius latimanus i c g
 Ericthonius ledoyeri Barnard & Karaman, 1991 g
 Ericthonius macrodactylus i c g
 Ericthonius megalops (G. O. Sars, 1879) i c g
 Ericthonius parabrasiliensis Just, 2009 g
 Ericthonius pugnax i c g
 Ericthonius punctatus (Bate, 1857) i c g
 Ericthonius rodneyi Hughes & Lowry, 2006 g
 Ericthonius rubricornis (Stimpson, 1853) i c g b
 Ericthonius stephenseni i c g
 Ericthonius tacitus Moore, 1988 g
 Ericthonius tolli Brüggen, 1909 i c g
 Ericthonius tropicalis Just, 2009 g

Data sources: i = ITIS, c = Catalogue of Life, g = GBIF, b = Bugguide.net

References

Corophiidea
Articles created by Qbugbot
Malacostraca genera